The 57th Street–Seventh Avenue station (signed as 57th Street) is an express station on the BMT Broadway Line of the New York City Subway. Located in Midtown Manhattan at the intersection of 57th Street and Seventh Avenue, it is served by the N and Q trains at all times, the R train at all times except late nights, and the W train on weekdays. It is directly adjacent to Carnegie Hall.

Station layout 

When this station opened on July 10, 1919, the BMT Broadway Line had ended north of this station as six trackways. Both the innermost and outermost pairs of trackways curved slightly west before ending, which were a provision for the line to run to Upper Manhattan via Central Park West. Only the two center tracks on either side continued to the 60th Street Tunnel to Queens. Both of the outermost trackways are ramps which have never been used, but the innermost tracks eventually connected the express tracks with the BMT 63rd Street Line, which was completed in 1989. Construction of the 63rd Street Line from 1971 to 1978 continued the section between this station and the Lexington Avenue–63rd Street station.

With four tracks and two island platforms, this station is the northernmost express station on the BMT Broadway Line. Much of the BMT system is chained from the zero point here. The N, R, and W trains use the local tracks, which continue north under 59th and 60th Streets to Queens, while Q trains, limited weekday rush hour N trains and one weekday a.m. rush hour R train use the center express tracks to continue north along the BMT 63rd Street Line to Lexington Avenue–63rd Street and the Second Avenue Subway.

North of the station, the local tracks continue into the 60th Street Tunnel to Queens, while the express tracks continue to 63rd Street, with switches to the 60th Street tunnel. South of the station, there are also crossovers between the two express tracks, between both northbound tracks, and between both southbound tracks.

The station was operated by the BMT until the city government took over the BMT's operations on June 1, 1940. This station underwent an overhaul in the late 1970s, which included fixing the station's structure and replacing the original wall tiles, old signs, and incandescent lighting with 1970s modern-look wall tile band and tablet mosaics, signs and fluorescent lights. Staircases and platform edges were also repaired.

Elevators 

In 1992–1993, the station received a major overhaul with state-of-the-art repairs as well as upgrading the station for ADA compliance. The original late 1910s tiling was restored, repairs were made to the staircases, new tiling on the floors, upgrades to the station's lights and public address system, installation of ADA safety treads along the platform edge, new signs, and new trackbeds in both directions. Accessibility to the mezzanine was further increased by the addition of a usable elevator on the southwest corner of 57th Street. While elevators had yet to be installed for platform access, the street elevator allowed disabled access to the fare booth and MetroCard vending machines. The MTA intended to provide ADA access to the platforms as part of the 2010–2014 Capital Plan.

Elevators to the platforms had been under design for several years, with the MTA originally planning to award contracts in November 2013, but the design process was delayed because of preexisting utilities blocking the way of the proposed elevator access. Other issues included asbestos abatement, the lack of available space underground for the expansion of the mezzanine, and the need to negotiate with another developer to install elevators. The MTA started working on a revised design in September 2015, and the construction contract was awarded in December 2017, allowing the start of construction. Ultimately, the location of the platform elevators was moved to the southern end of the station, near 55th Street, necessitating the installation of a new street-to-mezzanine elevator at 55th Street. Substantial completion was projected for May 2021; the elevators opened that month.

Exits 

 Stair to NW corner of 7th Avenue and 57th Street (adjacent to the Osborne Apartments)
 Stair to NE corner of 7th Avenue and 57th Street (adjacent to The Briarcliffe)
 Stair and elevator to SW corner of 7th Avenue and 57th Street (adjacent to the Rodin Studios)
 Stair to SE corner of 7th Avenue and 57th Street (adjacent to Carnegie Hall)
 Stair to NW corner of 7th Avenue and 55th Street (adjacent to Park Central Hotel)
  Stair and elevator to NE corner of 7th Avenue and 55th Street (adjacent to Hotel Wellington)
 Stair to SW corner of 7th Avenue and 55th Street
 Stair to SE corner of 7th Avenue and 55th Street

Proposed extension 

North of this station are tunnel stub headings running straight from the local tracks for a proposed line under Central Park West or Morningside Avenue, that would have terminated either at 145th Street or 155th Street.

When the BRT / BMT was building the Broadway line as part of the Dual Contracts, the company also wanted to be awarded the Central Park West / Eighth Avenue route, which was on the planning boards at that time. The company figured that if they built ramps from the Broadway line that could naturally be extended to an Eighth Avenue line, they would get a toehold on being awarded that line, rather than lose out to the IRT, the only other subway operator when the Dual Contracts were built. The BMT / BRT never built that line for various reasons including the bankruptcy of the company after the Malbone Street Wreck and Mayor Hylan's plan to include the Eighth Avenue / CPW route in the IND system. The ramps were built but never used for revenue service. They were eventually used for storage until the tracks were disconnected.

The ramp on the northbound side has a Maintenance-of-Way shed built on it, and the trackway on the southbound side also has a storage shed sitting in it, just north of where the local tracks come in, but this shed is few hundred feet north of the shed on the opposite trackway of the other side of the tunnel. Some of the actual rails remain and can be seen from passing express/63rd Street Line trains, but are covered by many years of dirt. The never-used trackways curve slightly west before ending.

References

External links 

 
 Station Reporter – N Train
 Station Reporter – R Train
 Station Reporter – Q Train
 MTA's Arts For Transit – 57th Street–7th Avenue (BMT Broadway Line)
 57th Street entrance from Google Maps Street View
 55th Street entrance from Google Maps Street View
 Platform from Google Maps Street View

BMT Broadway Line stations
New York City Subway stations in Manhattan
Railway stations in the United States opened in 1919
Midtown Manhattan
Seventh Avenue (Manhattan)
57th Street (Manhattan)